Shi Tengfei (born 5 October 1988, Beijing) is a Chinese swimmer. He competed for China at the 2012 Summer Olympics in the men's 4 x 100 m freestyle relay.

References

1988 births
Living people
Chinese male freestyle swimmers
Swimmers from Beijing
Swimmers at the 2012 Summer Olympics
Olympic swimmers of China
Asian Games medalists in swimming
Swimmers at the 2010 Asian Games

Asian Games gold medalists for China
Medalists at the 2010 Asian Games
21st-century Chinese people